Liniques Theron (born 4 January 1995 in Windhoek) is a retired Namibian female tennis player.

Theron reached a career-high singles ranking of 1170 on 12 June 2017 and career-high doubles ranking of 1138 on 23 November 2015.

Playing for Namibia at the Fed Cup, Theron has a win–loss record of 5–11.

ITF finals

Doubles: 1 (0–1)

Fed Cup participation

Singles

Doubles

References

External links
 
 
 

1995 births
Living people
Sportspeople from Windhoek
Namibian female tennis players
Competitors at the 2019 African Games
African Games competitors for Namibia
White Namibian people
20th-century Namibian women
21st-century Namibian women